Óscar Fernández may refer to:

Footballers
 Óscar Fernández Moraleda (born 1971), Spanish retired footballer in the 2002–03 Sporting de Gijón season
 Óscar Fernández (football manager) (born 1974), Spanish football manager
 Óscar Fernández (Mexican footballer) (born 1987), Mexican footballer
 Óscar Fernández (footballer, born 1995), Spanish footballer

Other sports
 Oscar Fernández (fencer) (born 1962), Spanish fencer
 Óscar Fernández (athlete) (born 1974), Spanish long-distance runner
 Óscar Fernández (judoka) (born 1978), Spanish judoka
 Óscar Fernández (racing driver), Spanish racing driver noted for driving the Sun Red SR21
 Óscar Fernández (sprinter), Peruvian track and field sprinter who shares the Peruvian record in athletics in the 4 x 100 m relay

Others
 Oscar Lorenzo Fernández (1897–1948), Brazilian composer
 Oscar Fernandez-Taranco (born 1957), Argentine assistant-secretary of the United Nations